Gladiator of Rome is a 1962 Italian adventure film directed by Mario Costa.  Co-written by Gian Paolo Callegari and Giuseppe Mariani, it stars Gordon Scott.

The film is also known as Battles of the Gladiators in the United Kingdom.

Cast 

Gordon Scott as Marcus
Wandisa Guida as Nista
Roberto Risso as Valerio Jr.
Ombretta Colli as Aglae
Alberto Farnese as Vezio Rufo
Gianni Solaro as Macrino
Charles Borromel as Anio
Piero Lulli as Astarte
Mirko Ellis as Frasto
Pietro De Vico as Pompilio
Nando Tamberlani as Valerio's Father
Andrea Aureli as Settimio
Raf Baldassarre as Gladiator
Célina Cély
Pietro Tordi as Slaves guard
Germana Francioli
Pietro Ceccarelli as Gladiator
Miranda Campa as Porzia
Giulio Battiferri as Spy slave
Leo Garavaglia
Eleonora Vargas as Prisca

See also
1962 in film
List of Italian films of 1962

References

External links 

 (dubbed in English; requires Adobe Flash)

1960s adventure films
1962 films
Films set in ancient Rome
Films set in the Roman Empire
1960s Italian-language films
Peplum films
Sword and sandal films
Films directed by Mario Costa
1960s Italian films